Ikela Territory an administrative division of Tshuapa Province of the Democratic Republic of the Congo.  The headquarters of the Territory is the town of Ikela.
The territory is divided into Loile Sector, Lofome Sector, Lokina Sector, Tumbenga Sector and Tshuapa Sector.

References

Territories of Tshuapa Province